Makham Sung is a subdistrict in the Mueang Phitsanulok District of Phitsanulok Province, Thailand.

Geography
The topography of Makham Sung is lowlands. The subdistrict borders Thothae of Wat Bot District to the north, Ban Pa to the east, Pak Thok and Hua Ro to the south and the Nan and Khwae Noi Rivers to the west (opposite Chom Thong).  Makham Sung lies in the Nan Basin, which is part of the Chao Phraya Watershed. The Khwae Noi meets the Nan River on the border of Makham Sung and Chom Thong.  The Khwae Noi marks the border between the two subdistricts, while the Nan River continues through Chom Thong.

Administration
The following is a list of the subdistrict's muban, which roughly correspond to villages:

Points of interest
Power plant
Public Health Center

Schools
โรงเรียนศึกษาพิเศษ
โรงเรียนจุฬาภรณ์ราชวิทยาลัย
โรงพยาบาลแม่และเด็ก
โรงเรียนหัววังกร่าง in Ban Nong Luang
ไทยรัฐวิทยา 8 in Ban Laem San

Temples
Wat Nong Luang in Ban Nong Luang
วัดโคกปู in muban 7
วัดตะโก in muban 4

References

Tambon of Phitsanulok province
Populated places in Phitsanulok province